Wyre Dock railway station served Fleetwood in Lancashire, England, from 1885 to 1970.

Wyre Dock passenger station was constructed in 1885, on the Fleetwood Branch Line from Poulton-le-Fylde, about half a mile from the Fleetwood main terminus.  The station stood at the southern end of Dock Street, about a quarter mile from Wyre Dock itself.  There had been a branch line for freight only to Wyre Dock since its construction in 1877, to support the distribution of fish. Fleetwood locomotive depot was located on the east side of the line south of the station. It was closed by British Railways in 1965.

Fleetwood's main terminus was closed on 18 April 1966, as a result of the Beeching Cuts, and Wyre Dock was renamed "Fleetwood" station, as the terminus of the Fleetwood Branch Line. Light industry developed in the area, and, in the 1990s, the new A585 Amounderness Way bypass was built on the former railway route.

Notes

References
 Suggitt, G. (2003, revised 2004) Lost Railways of Lancashire, Countryside Books, Newbury, 
 Welch, M.S. (2004) Lancashire Steam Finale, Runpast Publishing, Cheltenham,

External links 

 Poulton and Wyre Railway Society, working towards restoring passenger services to Fleetwood.

Disused railway stations in the Borough of Wyre
Fleetwood
Former Preston and Wyre Joint Railway stations
Railway stations in Great Britain opened in 1885
Railway stations in Great Britain closed in 1970